Silkhenge structures are a means of spider reproduction used by one or more currently-unknown species of spider. It typically consists of a central "spire" constructed of spider silk, containing one to two eggs, surrounded by a sort of fence of silk in a circle.

Discovery
In August 2013, Georgia Tech student Troy Alexander was visiting Tambopata National Reserve in Peru. He found, under a tarpaulin, a tiny bit of silk in a circular pattern one inch wide. Searching around, he found three more. He posted a picture on Reddit asking for help identifying it. No information was forthcoming, as this turned out to be a completely unknown phenomenon. His discovery acquired the name "silkhenge" because of its similarity to Stonehenge.

At the end of that year, an eight-day expedition led by Phil Torres found dozens more examples of this phenomenon, generally on the trunks of bamboo and cecropia trees. Spiderlings hatching from the structures were documented, but like many baby arthropods they lacked the features typically used to identify adults, and none lived to adulthood. DNA tests were also inconclusive, so the species creating these structures remained unidentified. A video was posted on YouTube of spiderlings hatching.

Among the hypothesized reasons for the fence were the possibilities that it is intended to trap mites that live in the same environment, as food for the hatchlings, or that it protects the egg and baby spider from ants.

References 

Spiders
Silk
Invertebrates of Peru
Shelters built or used by animals
Eggs
2013 in biology